× Heucherella is an evergreen perennial flowering plant in the family Saxifragaceae. A hybrid of garden origin, it is the result of a cross between two distinct genera, Heuchera and Tiarella, and shows similarities to both parents. This type of intergeneric hybrid is quite rare, and is indicated by a multiplication symbol before the name. The name Heucherella is an example of a portmanteau word, a combination of the two parents' names.

History
× Heucherella was first bred in France in 1912 by Emile Lemoine, who created a sterile hybrid between Heuchera × brizoides and Tiarella cordifolia. It was later named ×Heucherella tiarelloides. 'Bridget Bloom' was bred in 1950s by Percy Piper, at the suggestion of Alan Bloom. It is a cross between Heuchera 'Freedom' with pink flowers and Tiarella wherryi. It was brought to Blooms of Bressingham in 1955 and had the market to itself until 1983, which was when 'Rosalie' appeared (Kemper, William T.) These two flowers have pink petals, resembling heuchera and tiarella, and some reddish purple markings on their dark green leaves. Around 1987 'Tinian Pink' and 'Tinian White' were both created by Charles Oliver of the Primrose Path. These go by the names 'Pink Frost' and 'Snow White' in the trade.

Where a heucherella grows well depends on its breeding lines. Heucherellas bred from shade-loving heucheras will grow best in shade or part shade, those bred from sun-loving heucheras perform better in part shade to full sun. Most heucherellas have the strongest colors when grown in partial shade (preferably afternoon shade). Heucherella grow in USDA Zones 4–9, and in the milder zones are evergreen.

Characteristics
Heucherellas take their brilliant foliage colors from the Heuchera parents and the dark leaf patterns and cut-leaf shapes from the Tiarella parents. They are often called by their botanical name × Heucherella, but the common name in the USA is "foamy bells" because the common names of the parent plants are "coral bells", and "foam flower" respectively. Flowers may be white, pink or cream, and usually appear in spring.

Most heucherella prefer partial shade, though the newer strains are more sun tolerant. They prefer well-drained organic soils and regular watering. They send up new growth every year in spring. They make their best color displays in the cool seasons of spring or fall if they are of the colorful leaf type. They have few pests and diseases if grown in good soil in the proper conditions, and divided every three to four years.

They can be used as ground cover underneath shrubs like dogwood or beautyberry, or in association with hostas, ferns, astilbes, coral bells, and other shade-loving perennials. Other plant associations include barrenwort, bleeding heart, Japanese painted fern, Jacob's ladder, lamium, lungwort and Solomon's seal. Heucherella can also be placed in large containers to brighten up shady areas.

Cultivars

 'Alabama Sunrise' - leaves gold with red veining, white flowers
 'Bridget Bloom' - ; grows best in full sun with some shade in hot summers
 'Dayglow Pink'- ; maple-like green leaves with chocolate brown veining; bright pink flowers
 'Gold Zebra' (was 'Golden Zebra') - leaves feathery, bright yellow, marked with dark red veins, white flowers
 'Stoplight' - spread , yellow leaves with dark red blotches, white flowers
 'Strike It Rich' (syn.
 'Tapestry' - multicolored veins foliage with free-flowering stems of warm pink flowers

The cultivars 'Brass Lantern', 'Kimono', and 'Yellowstone Falls'  have gained the Royal Horticultural Society's Award of Garden Merit.

References

External links
Heucherella_Terra_Nova
Heucherella_Dayton_Nurseries
Heucherella (Foamy Bells)_Sooner_Plant_Farm
 Heucherella 'Stoplight' PP16835 COPF_Walter_Gardens Inc.
Missouri Botanical Garden. 2001–2010. Web. 8 March 2010.
.
Monrovia.
Wayside_Gardens.

Saxifragaceae
Plant nothogenera
Saxifragaceae genera